The Estelnic is a right tributary of the Râul Negru in Romania. It flows into the Râul Negru near the village Lunga, east of Târgu Secuiesc.

References

Rivers of Romania
Rivers of Covasna County